Sarah Clark is an American politician from the state of New York. A Democrat, Clark has represented the 136th district of the New York State Assembly, based in outer Rochester and the nearby suburbs of Irondequoit and Brighton, since November 2020.

Early career
After graduating from East High School and attending Stony Brook University, Clark interned for then-Mayor of Rochester Bill Johnson. Clark went on to work for U.S. Senators Hillary Clinton and Kirsten Gillibrand, serving as Gillibrand's deputy state director from her appointment in 2009 onwards.

Political career
In 2020, after incumbent Jamie Romeo was appointed as Monroe County Clerk, Clark announced she would run for the 136th district of the New York State Assembly. With the backing of Hillary Clinton, Kirsten Gillibrand, and the Working Families Party, Clark handily won the Democratic primary 63-28% over county legislator Justin Wilcox. Clark faced no major-party opposition in the general election, and was seated in the Assembly on November 12.

Personal life
Clark lives in the Maplewood neighborhood of Rochester with her husband, John, and their three children.

References

Living people
Politicians from Rochester, New York
Stony Brook University alumni
Democratic Party members of the New York State Assembly
Women state legislators in New York (state)
21st-century American politicians
21st-century American women politicians
Year of birth missing (living people)